Isonandra lanceolata is a plant in the family Sapotaceae. The specific epithet lanceolata means "spear-shaped", referring to the leaves.

Description
The bark is chocolate brown. Inflorescences bear up to 10 pale yellow flowers.

Distribution and habitat
Isonandra lanceolata is native to Tamil Nadu (India), Sri Lanka and Borneo. It grows in forests up to  altitude.

References

lanceolata
Flora of Tamil Nadu
Flora of Sri Lanka
Flora of Borneo
Plants described in 1840